Coquena is a genus of small-headed fly found in Argentina and Chile. It was first established by Evert I. Schlinger in 2013.

The genus is named after the Coquena legend of north-western Argentina. The type species, Coquena stangei, is named after Dr. Lionel A. Stange, who collected the type series.

Species
The genus includes two species:

Coquena coquimbensis González & Ramírez, 2021 – Chile
Coquena stangei Schlinger in Schlinger, Gillung & Borkent, 2013 – Argentina

References

Acroceridae
Nemestrinoidea genera
Diptera of South America
Arthropods of Argentina
Arthropods of Chile